Malaysia competed at the 2011 World Aquatics Championships in Shanghai, China between July 16 and 31, 2011.

Diving

Malaysia qualified 8 athletes in diving.

Men

Women

Swimming

Malaysia qualified 5 swimmers.

Men

Women

Synchronised swimming

Malaysia has qualified 9 athletes in synchronised swimming.

Women

Reserve
Tasha Jane

References

2011 in Malaysian sport
Nations at the 2011 World Aquatics Championships
Malaysia at the World Aquatics Championships